Alan A'Court (30 September 1934 – 14 December 2009) was an English footballer who mostly played for Liverpool. He gained five caps for England and represented the nation at the 1958 FIFA World Cup.

Playing career
Born in Rainhill, Lancashire, England, A'Court was a winger who started out at Prescot Cables as an amateur before he was signed by Reds manager Don Welsh. A'Court made his debut in a league match at Ayresome Park on 7 February 1953, a game that saw Liverpool take both the points from a 3–2 win. His first goal came a month later on 14 March, again in a league match, this time at Anfield in a 2–0 victory over Sunderland.

A'Court, who followed Rugby league, signed from Prescot as an 18-year-old in September 1952, spurning the advances of Everton and Bolton Wanderers to become an Anfield apprentice, a decision that paid off as just six months after joining he made his first team debut. The following season A'Court played 16 times, as Liverpool were relegated to the Second Division.

During the Anfield club's first season in the second tier of English football A'Court established himself as a first team regular making 33 league and cup appearances. A'Court remained consistent as Liverpool failed to regain their top flight status. By the age of 24 years and 89 days he had played 200 league games for the Reds becoming the youngest player to do so, a record that still stands.

Although the strong and talented A'Court could have left to play for teams in the First Division, his loyalty to Liverpool was rewarded in 1961–62 when, as an ever-present, he and the Reds celebrated promotion back to the First Division under the guidance of Bill Shankly, finishing a full 8 points (in the days of 2 points for a win) clear of second placed Leyton Orient. A'Court was selected 23 times during Liverpool's first season back amongst football's elite teams; he helped Liverpool to an  eighth place finish in the First Division.

Whilst still in Division 2 A'Court's skill alerted England manager Walter Winterbottom, who was looking for a player to replace an injured Tom Finney; Winterbottom handed the left winger the first of his 5 caps on 6 November 1957 in a British Championship match against Northern Ireland at Wembley. A'Court's only goal for his country and a goal for Duncan Edwards were not enough to prevent England losing the game 3–2. The highlight of his career was representing England at the 1958 FIFA World Cup in Sweden, where he played in England's last three matches against Brazil (0–0), Austria (2–2), and the group stage play-off game against the USSR (0–1). He did this despite playing for a club in the Second Division.

Unfortunately for A'Court, injuries began to take their toll. He missed the whole of the 1963–64 championship winning season, so Shankly signed Peter Thompson from Preston North End. After spending most of his career at Liverpool, playing 382 times and scoring 63 goals, A'Court was allowed to leave. He joined Tranmere Rovers for a fee of £4,500 in October 1964. A'Court's final outing in a Red shirt was in a historic match: Liverpool's first ever European match at Anfield, the game was a European Cup preliminary round 2nd leg match on 14 September 1964. Liverpool had won the first encounter with Icelandic side KR 5–0 but rather than treat the return leg as a mere formality, the Reds finished off the job with a comprehensive 6–1 victory.

Coaching career
He later became player-coach at Norwich City before taking on various coaching jobs, including posts in Zambia and New Zealand, he also became assistant manager at Stoke City when Tony Waddington called upon his services in 1969. In January 1978 George Eastham was sacked and A'Court was put in caretaker charge. His only match in charge of Stoke came in the FA Cup at home to non-league Blyth Spartans in 1977–78, Stoke lost the match 3–2.

Once new manager Alan Durban was appointed A'Court moved to Crewe Alexandra as an assistant manager. He then went to join the sport staff at North Staffordshire Polytechnic. He managed Nantwich Town from September 1983 to April 1984.

Post retirement
After finally retiring from football, A'Court ran a tobacconist/newsagent shop on the borders of Birkenhead and Bebington. A'Court died of cancer on 14 December 2009.

Career statistics

Club
Source:

International
Source:

International goals
Scores and results list England's goal tally first.

Manager

References
 Specific

 General

External links
 Player profile at LFChistory.net
 Exclusive interview at LFChistory.net
 

1934 births
2009 deaths
1958 FIFA World Cup players
England international footballers
England under-23 international footballers
English football managers
English footballers
Association football wingers
Liverpool F.C. players
Norwich City F.C. players
People associated with Staffordshire University
People from Rainhill
Stoke City F.C. managers
English Football League players
Tranmere Rovers F.C. players
Deaths from cancer in England
English Football League managers
Stoke City F.C. non-playing staff
English Football League representative players
People educated at Prescot Grammar School
Nantwich Town F.C. managers
Association football coaches